Aleksandar Đoković (also transliterated Aleksandar Djoković; born 16 December 1991) is a Serbian footballer.

Senior career
In 2013, Đoković moved to Hapoel Nir Ramat HaSharon of the Israel Premier League; however, after a lack of playing time, Đoković signed with LA Galaxy II of the third division American league, USL Pro. Galaxy II are the reserve team of Major League Soccer outfit, LA Galaxy.

Đoković scored his first goal for Galaxy II on April 8, 2014 against Oklahoma City Energy FC en route to a 4–2 victory for Galaxy II. On May 14, 2014, Đoković netted his second goal for Galaxy II in a U.S. Open Cup match against fifth division side Cal FC, en route to a 6–1 victory.

International career
Đoković represented Serbia at Under-17 and Under-19 level.

References

External links
 
 
 

1991 births
Living people
Serbian footballers
Serbia youth international footballers
Serbian expatriate footballers
Association football forwards
FK Partizan players
FK Teleoptik players
FK Bežanija players
FK Napredak Kruševac players
FK Mladost Lučani players
FK Novi Pazar players
Hapoel Nir Ramat HaSharon F.C. players
LA Galaxy II players
FC Urartu players
FK Mačva Šabac players
Serbian SuperLiga players
Serbian First League players
Israeli Premier League players
USL Championship players
Armenian Premier League players
Expatriate footballers in Israel
Expatriate soccer players in the United States
Expatriate footballers in Armenia
Serbian expatriate sportspeople in Israel
Serbian expatriate sportspeople in the United States
Serbian expatriate sportspeople in Armenia